The Untold Story 2 a.k.a. Human Flesh Bun 2  (人肉叉燒包II之天誅地滅) is a 1998 Hong Kong film. It is a sequel to The Untold Story, also starred Anthony Wong Chau-Sang in a different role.

Plot
An unhappily married couple, Chung and his wife Kuen in Hong Kong invite the wife's beautiful cousin, who has survived a horrifying experience in Mainland China, to live with them. She has her own special way of overcoming hardship and becomes the master of the barbecue.

Cast

External links 
 
 HK Cinemagic entry

1998 films
1990s Cantonese-language films
1998 horror films
Hong Kong horror films
Hong Kong sequel films
1990s Hong Kong films